Myrmeocorus allodapus is a species of beetle in the family Cerambycidae, the only species in the genus Myrmeocorus.

References

Callidiopini
Monotypic beetle genera